Love Goes Up and Down is a 1946 Swedish comedy film directed by Rolf Husberg. 
The film stars Sture Lagerwall, Eva Dahlbeck and Thor Modéen.

Plot summary
Sixten is a screenwriter who reluctantly travels to a ski resort in Åre to prepare a love story for a film set in a ski environment. Before he has time to go a journalist from a tabloid newspaper, Vivi Bostrom, calls him to ask him about his plans. They end up immediately quarrelling. She then takes the train to Åre and does her best to get back at him. Revenge will be sweet, and snowy.

Cast
Sture Lagerwall as Sixten Kennebeck, screenwriter
Eva Dahlbeck as Vivi Boström, journalist at Kvällsexpressen
Thor Modéen as Sture Nylén, Wholesaler 
Agneta Lagerfeldt as Anne-Sofie 
Sigge Fürst as Larsson
Hjördis Petterson as "Scorpion"
John Botvid as Fingal Andersson 
Bullan Weijden as Agda Nylén
Douglas Håge as District Police Superintendent 
Holger Höglund as Holmström, Reception Clerk 
Magnus Kesster as Film Producer
Kenne Fant as Actor in Studio
Mimi Nelson as Actress in Studio
Börje Mellvig as Director in Studio
Nils Hultgren as Film Producer
Stig Johanson as Printer at Kvällsexpressen
Albin Erlandzon as Printer at Kvällspressen
Leif Hedenberg as Hotel Porter
Karin Miller as Hotel Waitress
Gunnar Hedberg as Hotel Guest

External links

1946 films
1940s Swedish-language films
Swedish sports comedy films
Films directed by Rolf Husberg
1940s sports comedy films
1946 comedy films
Swedish black-and-white films
1940s Swedish films